Ali Fredrick Farokhmanesh (born April 16, 1988) is an American former professional basketball player and current Colorado State Rams men's basketball assistant coach. Farokhmanesh gained nationwide fame in the 2010 NCAA Division I men's basketball tournament as a member of the Northern Iowa Panthers men's basketball team, when he hit a crucial three-point shot to help UNI upset top-overall seed Kansas in the second round. His heroics, which came two days after hitting the game-winning three-point shot against UNLV in the first round, led to an appearance on the cover of Sports Illustrated.

Playing career
After going undrafted in the 2010 NBA draft, Farokhmanesh signed a deal to play for SAM Massagno Basket, an LNB Division A team based in Massagno, Switzerland.

In 2011, Farokhmanesh signed with the Austrian team WBC Raiffeisen Wels. His contract was renewed in June 2012.  Farokhmanesh averaged 13.7 points per game in Austria.

On August 14, 2013, Farokhmanesh signed with SPM Shoeters Den Bosch in the Netherlands. In April, Farokhmanesh won the DBL Sixth Man of the Year award.

Coaching career
In 2014, Farokhmanesh stopped playing professionally, becoming a graduate assistant at Nebraska. In 2016, head coach Tim Miles promoted him to director of player relations and development. 

On April 28, 2017, Farokhmanesh joined the Drake men's basketball program as an assistant coach for Niko Medved. On March 26, 2018, he followed Medved to become his assistant at Colorado State University.

Honors
 SPM Shoeters Den Bosch
DBL Sixth Man of the Year (1): 2014
Dutch Supercup (1): 2013

Statistics

Regular season

|-
| style="text-align:left;"| 2010–11
| style="text-align:left;"|  SAM Massagno Basket
| align=center | LNBA
| 30 || 33.9 || .543 || .480 || .865 || 2.2 || 3.1 || 2.3 || 0.0 || 19.5
|-
| style="text-align:left;"| 2011–12
| style="text-align:left;"|  WBC Raiffeisen Wels
| align=center | ÖBL
| 36 || 29.3 || .497 || .497 || .761 || 1.9 || 3.4 || 0.8 || 0.0 || 13.6
|-
| style="text-align:left;"| 2012–13
| style="text-align:left;"|  WBC Raiffeisen Wels
| align=center | ÖBL
| 32 || 34.7 || .505 || .415 || .828 || 3.5 || 3.9 || 1.3 || 0.0 || 13.7
|-
| style="text-align:left;"| 2013–14
| style="text-align:left;"|  SPM Shoeters Den Bosch
| align=center | DBL
| 35 || 26.0 || .506 || .376 || .818 || 1.6 || 2.0 || 1.0 || 0.0 || 9.8
|-
|}

Personal life
Farokhmanesh was born in Pullman, Washington, where he attended high school at Pullman High School for two years before moving to Iowa and attending West High School in Iowa City, Iowa.  He then attended junior college at Indian Hills Community College and Kirkwood Community College before transferring to the University of Northern Iowa. In 2014, he stopped playing professionally and became an assistant coach for the Nebraska Cornhuskers. 

Farokhmanesh is of European and Iranian descent. His father, Mashallah, was born in Borujerd and was a member of the Iranian men's national volleyball team, before immigrating to the United States in 1977, where he played for professional teams and eventually became a coach. Mashallah married Ali's mother, Cindy Fredrick, who has been the head coach for the women's volleyball team at the University of Iowa since 2004. Before moving to Iowa, Fredrick was the head coach of the Washington State University's women's volleyball team for 15 years, where she had a record of 278 wins and 192 losses. Cindy and her husband briefly coached at small Luther College. Cindy and Mashallah now both coach the UNLV women's volleyball team as head coach and assistant coach, respectively. In 2014, Farokhmanesh married the former Mallory Husz. They have four children.

During the COVID-19 pandemic, which caused the cancellation of the 2020 NCAA tournament and all NCAA-sponsored spring sports and also led to most U.S. universities going to online-only instruction, the Farokhmanesh family re-created his famous NCAA tournament shot in an empty Moby Arena on the 10th anniversary of the UNI–Kansas game. The shot was captured for a web video that Colorado State posted on its official athletics Twitter account.

References

External links
Austrian League profile
Northern Iowa Panthers bio

1988 births
Living people
American expatriate basketball people in Austria
American expatriate basketball people in Switzerland
American men's basketball players
American people of Iranian descent
Basketball players from Iowa
Basketball players from Washington (state)
Colorado State Rams men's basketball coaches
Heroes Den Bosch players
Drake Bulldogs men's basketball coaches
Dutch Basketball League players
Indian Hills Warriors basketball players
Kirkwood Community College alumni
Northern Iowa Panthers men's basketball players
People from Pullman, Washington
Point guards
SAM Basket players
Sportspeople from Iowa City, Iowa
Iowa City West High School alumni